Hallands Nation is the youngest of the thirteen nations at Lund university. Originally, it organised students from the Swedish province of Halland, although nowadays there is no need for members to come from any particular region.

History 
In 1920, a Hallandic student association was formed within Göteborgs Nation. Even from the start the main aim of the association was to break free and form a nation of its own, but it took some years of negotiation over the allocation of debts and assets before Hallands Nation was formed on October 15, 1928. When it was formed the nation had some 80 members - about as many as Kalmar nation had - a fairly normal number of members for the time. After Hallands Nation was formed the university decided not to recognise any additional nations, thus Hallands Nation is and remains the youngest nation in Lund.

Organisation
Hallands Nation has roughly 2,000 members. Some 69 people are responsible for 79 different posts within the nation's organisational structure. Five of these are part of the so-called Quratel, which is the main governing body of the nation. A further eleven people are part of the Seniorskollegium, which functions as the board of the nation. Seven people form an election committee, interviewing and nominating people to hold posts within the nation. All of these are in turn elected by a general meeting of the nation's members. A separate post is that of Inspector, a teacher of the university elected by the nation and approved by the vice-chancellor, who presides over meetings and performs some ceremonial duties.

Inspectors
Albert Nilsson (1928–1932)
Torsten Hellman (1930–1932)
Ragnar Bergendal (1932–1951)
Karl Gustav Ljunggren (1951–1958)
Sölve Welin (1958–1970)
Gunnar Bramstång (1970–1999) (currently honorary inspector)
Allan T. Malm (1999-2014)

Honorary members (selection)
Ernst Wigforss (1937)
Fredrik Ström (1945)
Prins Bertil (1948)
Alf Ahlberg (1948)
Hakon Ahlberg (1955)
Bo Giertz (1955)
Erik Olson (1959)
Yngve Holmberg (1971?)
Bertil Gärtner (1980)
Ingemund Bengtsson (1984)
Bengt Samuelsson (1988)
Carl Bildt (1995)
Björn Hellberg (1998)
Bengt Johansson (2001)
Johan Staël von Holstein (2006)
Lasse Brandeby (2009)

The house 
Halland's Nation's house is located at Thomanders väg 1-5 near Västgöta Nation's house at Tornavägen. The house, or Hallandsgården 1,2 & 3 as the now three houses are really called, were originally two separate buildings built in 1955 and 1959 at what was then the outskirts of the city. In the middle of the 1990s the two houses were joined with a new house built between them - Hallandsgården 3.

During the construction of Hallandsgården 3 the two houses and the roughly 70 students' rooms they contained were thoroughly renovated. An additional fourth floor, slightly narrower than the lower floors was also built on top of the two houses. The reason for this fourth floor being narrower than the rest was due to the then city architect of Lund who didn't want the most beautiful house fronts of the 1950s to be destroyed by and additional floor.

This meant that an additional two corridors of student housing were added to the already existing six, at the top of the two original buildings from 1955 and 1959. The newest part of the house, Hallandsgården 3, which was finished in 1996, does not only contain some twenty students' rooms with kitchens but also the main office of the nation. On the top floor is the common party hall, called "Hallands Ås".

Activities 
Anapart from day-to-day activities such as lunches, pubs and clubs, the nation also arranges several different festivities throughout the year.
 Bockbalen: The nation's yearly ball, usually held during March. It was first celebrated in 1966 and has, with the exception of a few years during the 1970s, been held every year since.
 Hedviggillet: To celebrate the forming of Hallands Nation there is a celebration every autumn. During the day there are games held between Hallands Nation, Göteborgs Nation and visiting friendly nations and societies. During the evening there is a large sittning.
 Kulknappsbalen: A ball held at very special occasions in order to honor the memory of king Charles XII who was according to legend killed when he was shot with a uniform button. It is held elsewhere than Lund, and was last held at Varberg fortress on October 18, 2008, to mark the 80th anniversary of the forming of the nation.
 Laxen: During the evening of the last of April there is a traditional salmon dinner at Hallands Ås.

Friendships 
 Uppsala: Gotlands nation
 Helsingfors: Kymenlaakson osakunta
 Copenhagen: Studenterforeningen
 Halmstad: Änglarådet at the Military Academy of Halmstad
 Halmstad: The Student Union of the University of Halmstad

References

External links
Hallands Nation

Nations at Lund University